Tomáš Jan Baťa,  (anglicised to Thomas J. Bata; September 17, 1914 – September 1, 2008), also known as Thomas Bata Jr. and Tomáš Baťa ml., was a Czech-Canadian businessman and philanthropist. He ran the Bata Shoe Company from the 1940s until the 80s.

Life and career
Baťa was born in the city of Prague, in what is now the Czech Republic, the son of Czech industrialist Tomáš Baťa. As a boy he apprenticed under his father, who began the T. & A. Bata Shoe Company in 1894 in Zlín (now in the Czech Republic). Baťa's father, however, was killed in a plane crash in 1932, when young Baťa was only 17. Baťa's original surname is Batia.

One of the reasons for Tomáš Baťa's success was his vision to introduce new technologies to his company, taking production to massive levels worldwide. Another factor was World War I, which ended the market that the company had under the Austro-Hungarian Empire. So between the 1920s and 1940s, Bata built factories in Asia, South America and Africa (which he foresaw as a virgin market), thus becoming the largest shoemaker in the world. In the 1960s and 1970s, the Bata white canvas sneaker/running shoe was iconic in the third world, representing between 60% and 80% of the shoe production in the countries where it operated. In Asia and South America, the company focused on everyday affordable shoe production, leaving for Europe the high-quality, high-price shoes.

In the mid-1930s, in the throes of the Great Depression, the Bata shoe company was faced with a serious dilemma: Mussolini needed boots for his army. Czechoslovaks were faced with ubiquitous layoffs and catastrophic unemployment. Baťa decided to be pragmatic to protect his livelihood and that of his employees. He rationalized that if he did not provide the army boots, some other company would, and his employees would suffer. He successfully pursued the contract, which directly assisted fascism but also saved the company.

Tomáš Baťa was the equivalent of Henry Ford in breakthrough technology for his time. The company's warehouse in the then Czechoslovakia was the first automated installation in Europe (designed by Peter Behrens, architect). In the company headquarters in Zlín, the central shaft of the building was an elevator with a personal office that could move from one floor to another. Like Ford, he established a repetitive mechanical system of production, which he called "work factor". Tomáš Baťa had a social concern for his employees, paying fair wages and contributing to their welfare with social programs and sports facilities sponsored and financially supported by the company.

Baťa attended school in Czechoslovakia, England and Switzerland. Anticipating the Second World War, he, together with over 100 families from Czechoslovakia, moved to Canada in 1939 to develop the Bata Shoe Company of Canada, including a shoe factory and engineering plant, centred in a town that still bears his name, Batawa, Ontario. Another legacy is Batanagar in Kolkata (Calcutta) India, which originally housed the shoe factory and the clerical employees, and today is a booming condominium development maintaining the name.

Baťa successfully established and ran the new Canadian operations and during the war years, he sought to maintain the necessary coordination with as many of the overseas Bata operations as was possible. During this period, the Canadian engineering plant manufactured strategic components for the Allies, and Baťa worked together with the government in exile of President Beneš and other democratic powers. With the end of the war, the Bata company in Czechoslovak territory was nationalized and the communists began to take control and to eliminate anything even remotely reminding people of Baťa's system.

In 1945, it was clear that Zlín was lost and could no longer act as headquarters. Baťa held a meeting in East Tilbury near London, and the decision was taken that Bata Development Limited in England would become the service headquarters of the Bata Shoe Organization. In 1946, Bata operated 38 factories and 2,168 company shops; they produced 34 million pairs of shoes and employed 34,000 people. In 1948, however, Czechoslovakia was fully seized by the communist powers, and Bata enterprises in Poland, East Germany, Yugoslavia, Hungary, Romania and Bulgaria were lost.

The Bata Shoe Organization then expanded around the world. Between 1946 and 1960, 25 new factories were built and 1,700 company shops opened. In 1962, the Organization had production and sales activities in 79 countries – there were 66 factories and 4,100 company shops. Yearly output was 175 million pairs of shoes and the organization employed 80,000 people. Bata moved the headquarters of the organization to Toronto in 1964, and in 1965 an ultramodern building, the Bata International Centre, was opened. By 1975, the organization included 98 operating companies in 89 countries, employing 90,000 people; in the 90 factories, 250 million pairs of shoes were produced annually and the company operated over 5,000 shops. The Bata Shoe Organization, whose guiding principle was "Our customer – Our Master" was the largest of its kind in the world. Baťa led the organization until 1984, when his son Thomas George Bata became the CEO.

In December 1989, after the communist government fell in Czechoslovakia, Baťa made a triumphant return to his hometown. Václav Havel, the Czech dissident leader and playwright turned president, asked Baťa to return. Baťa and his wife Sonja were greeted warmly in the main square in Zlín by thousands of cheering people. Baťa immediately initiated plans for the return of the organization to the place where it all started. By 2008, Bata's Czech subsidiary operated 93 shops in the Czech Republic, 25 in Slovakia and 43 in Poland.

By 2000, the Bata company was struggling in Canada. In 2000, the original Batawa factory was closed. In 2001, the Bata stores in Canada were closed and the Bata Organization relocated its headquarters to Switzerland. Baťa remained in Toronto with his wife, Sonja. Despite his age, Baťa continued to take an active role in the business. He continued to travel extensively and to visit many of the Bata operations around the world. He also maintained his extensive contacts with world political and business leaders.

Baťa died on September 1, 2008, at Sunnybrook Health Sciences Centre in Toronto. A cause of death was not announced. He was survived by his wife Sonja (née Wettstein), whom he had married in 1946, their son and three daughters.

Legacy

Baťa was invested in 1972 as a Companion of the Order of Canada, Canada's highest civilian award, and he received the Order of Tomáš Garrigue Masaryk in the Czech Republic. He was particularly proud of his association with the Hastings and Prince Edward Regiment. He joined the regiment during the Second World War, and he served as a captain in the Canadian Reserve Army and as honorary colonel from 1999 to 2007. He was frequently seen in the field visiting with its troops. In 2007, he received the FIRST Award for Responsible Capitalism, the lifetime Achievement Medal.

Baťa worked with numerous charitable organizations. He was chairman of the Bata Shoe Foundation. His dedication to Junior Achievement International, Trent University and York University in Canada and the Tomáš Baťa University in the Czech Republic reflected his interest in the education of young people.

Baťa participated in several leading business organizations. In Canada, he had been a director of Canadian Pacific Airlines and IBM Canada. He was a founding member of the Young Presidents Organization, chairman of the Commission on Multinational Enterprises of the International Chamber of Commerce, chairman of the Business and Industry Advisory Committee to the OECD and founding member of the Canada India Business Council.

In 1969 the Bata Library was officially opened and after some reconstructions it was re-opened in 2018.

Awards
 1972 – Invested as a Companion of the Order of Canada
 1991 – Awarded the Czech Republic's top decoration, the Order of Tomáš Garrigue Masaryk
 2003 – Awarded the Retail Council of Canada's Lifetime Achievement Award

See also
 Bata shoe factory (East Tilbury)
 Bata Shoe Museum
 Tomas Bata Memorial (Zlín)

References

External links

Obituary in The Telegraph

Bata family
Bata Corporation
1914 births
2008 deaths
20th-century Canadian businesspeople
Czechoslovak emigrants to Canada
Companions of the Order of Canada
People from Zlín
Recipients of the Order of Tomáš Garrigue Masaryk
Czechoslovak businesspeople
Hastings and Prince Edward Regiment officers
Canadian Army personnel of World War II